Tarnawa is a Polish Coat of Arms. It was used by several szlachta families in the times of the Polish–Lithuanian Commonwealth.

History

Blazon

Notable bearers

Notable bearers of this Coat of Arms include:

External links 
  Tarnawa Coat of Arms and bearers.

See also

 Polish heraldry
 Heraldry
 Coat of Arms
 List of Polish nobility coats of arms

Sources 
 Dynastic Genealogy 
 Ornatowski.com 

Polish coats of arms